Josef Taurer was an Austrian international footballer. At club level, he played for Wiener AC and Vienna Cricket and Football-Club. He made 6 appearances for the Austria national team, scoring one goal, which was the first international goal scored by Austria.

External links
 
 National team stats

Association football forwards
Austrian footballers
Austria international footballers
Wiener AC players
Year of birth missing